Reichmannsdorf is a village and a former municipality in the district Saalfeld-Rudolstadt, in Thuringia, Germany. Since 1 January 2019, it is part of the town Saalfeld. Before, it belonged to the municipal association Lichtetal am Rennsteig, which consisted of the municipalities Lichte, Piesau, Reichmannsdorf, and Schmiedefeld.

See also
 Municipal associations in Thuringia

References

Former municipalities in Thuringia
Saalfeld-Rudolstadt